USABC may refer to:

US-ASEAN Business Council, leading advocacy organization for U.S businesses working in Southeast Asia
U.S. Advanced Battery Consortium LLC, an industry group operated by Chrysler, Ford, and General Motors as part of the United States Council for Automotive Research